2000 Rugby League World Cup qualification Pool B is one of the two groups in the 2000 Rugby League World Cup qualifying. The group comprises the Pacific Rim nations United States, Japan and Canada.

Standings

References

2000 Rugby League World Cup